William Nicholas Snyder (January 28, 1898 – October 8, 1934) was an American Major League Baseball pitcher from Mansfield, Ohio who appeared in 18 games between 1919 and 1920 for the Washington Senators.

Snyder died in Vicksburg, Michigan on October 8, 1934.

References

External links
Baseball-Reference.com

1898 births
1934 deaths
Baseball players from Ohio
Washington Senators (1901–1960) players
Sportspeople from Mansfield, Ohio
People from Vicksburg, Michigan